Westcott William Kingdon (July 4, 1900 – April 19, 1975) was an infielder in Major League Baseball. He played for the Washington Senators in 1932.

References

External links

1900 births
1975 deaths
Major League Baseball infielders
Washington Senators (1901–1960) players
Buffalo Bisons (minor league) players
Newark Bears (IL) players
Chattanooga Lookouts players
Baseball players from Los Angeles